Lin Feng (September 30, 1906 – September 29, 1977) was a Chinese male politician, who served as the vice chairperson of the Standing Committee of the National People's Congress.

References 

1906 births
1977 deaths
Vice Chairpersons of the National People's Congress